Konstantinos Iliopoulos (born 15 March 1989) is a Greek professional footballer who plays as a winger.

References

1989 births
Living people
Greek footballers
Super League Greece players
Football League (Greece) players
Gamma Ethniki players
Kalamata F.C. players
Vyzas F.C. players
A.E. Sparta P.A.E. players
Volos N.F.C. players
Association football wingers
Footballers from Kalamata